Okobie or Okogbe is a village in Ahoada West, Rivers State, Nigeria.

See also
 Okobie road tanker explosion

References

Populated places in Rivers State